Gregory L. Domingo is a Filipino business executive who served as Secretary of Trade and Industry under the administration of President Benigno Aquino III.

Background
Before being appointed to the Trade and Industry secretary post, He was the executive director of SM Investments Corporation.

DTI Secretary
President Benigno Aquino III expects Domingo to generate more jobs for the Filipino people under his administration. He is expected to be a one-year appointee only since defeated vice presidential candidate Mar Roxas will take over his post.

References

 

Living people
Filipino business executives
Secretaries of Trade and Industry of the Philippines
Benigno Aquino III administration cabinet members
Year of birth missing (living people)